Antiguraleus murrheus is a species of sea snail, a marine gastropod mollusk in the family Mangeliidae.

Description
The length of the shell attains 5 mm, its diameter 3 mm.

(Original description) The white shell is semitransparent. It contains  whorls, including a smooth protoconch of  whorls. The sculpture consists of longitudinal ribs, stronger on the earlier whorls, weaker towards the body whorl, which has about fifteen ribs extending to the suture. These ribs are crossed by faint spirals, the posterior or peripheral being the strongest, two on the second whorl, three above the aperture, a fourth on the body whorl, beyond which the longitudinal ribs only persist a short distance. The whorls are tabulated above the periphery. Seen under a lens, it shows many subsidiary spiral striations between the main spirals. The suture is well marked by a narrow overlapping of each whorl by the one following. The base has fifteen spiral striae. The aperture shows a conspicuous sinus in the infrasutural tabulation, but there is no anal fasciole. The type is waterworn.

Distribution
This marine species occurs off  Northland east coast to Cook Strait, New Zealand

References

 Powell, A.W.B. 1979: New Zealand Mollusca: Marine, Land and Freshwater Shells, Collins, Auckland (p. 239)
 Spencer, H.G., Marshall, B.A. & Willan, R.C. (2009). Checklist of New Zealand living Mollusca. pp 196–219. in: Gordon, D.P. (ed.) New Zealand inventory of biodiversity. Volume one. Kingdom Animalia: Radiata, Lophotrochozoa, Deuterostomia. Canterbury University Press, Christchurch.

External links
  Tucker, J.K. 2004 Catalog of recent and fossil turrids (Mollusca: Gastropoda). Zootaxa 682:1-1295.
 New Zealand Mollusca: Propebela murrhea
 Image of Antiguraleus murrheus

murrheus
Gastropods described in 1906
Gastropods of New Zealand